Castle Bolton is a village near Bolton Castle in Wensleydale, North Yorkshire, England. It gets its name from the castle which looks over the village green. The population of the civil parish was less than 100 at the 2011 census, so details are maintained in the parish of Redmire. In 2015, North Yorkshire County Council estimated the population to be 60.

The village is historically part of the North Riding of Yorkshire.

The village was largely constructed after the nearby castle and the houses were used by the retinue of Mary, Queen of Scots when she was imprisoned in the castle. The Dales artist Fred Lawson came for a holiday in 1910, set up his artist's studio in the middle of the village and loved it so much he never left.

See also
St Oswald's Church, Castle Bolton

References

External links

Villages in North Yorkshire